FC Dynamo Makhachkala is a Russian football club based in Makhachkala.

Club history
In the 2006 season Dynamo finished 16th in the Russian First Division. However, the club was denied the professional license and thus relegated to amateur level.

Colours are all white (home) or white shirt with broad blue stripe, blue shorts (away).

The club was founded in 1946 and debuted in the North Caucasus zone of the Soviet Group 3, finishing seventh of eight teams. Following this, Dynamo would not play in the Soviet League until 1958, when they entered Class B. In 1958–1960 the team was known as Temp. In 1967, Dynamo became the winners of Class B and were promoted to Class A, Group 2. After the reorganization of the league in 1971, Dynamo Makhachkala played in the Second League. They stayed at that level until 1990, when they were moved to Second League B. The best Dynamo's achievement in the league was the top finish in their zone and sixth position in the league finals in 1975.

Dynamo Makhachkala entered the Russian Second League in 1993, and after 1994 season they moved to the Third League. In 1996–1997 the team was known as Dynamo-Imamat. In 1998, following the reform of the league, Dynamo entered the Second Division and stayed there until winning in the South zone in 2003. Dynamo played in the First Division from 2004 to 2006.

Before the 2021–22 season, the team that previously played as FC Makhachkala was renamed to FC Dynamo Makhachkala. On 30 May 2022, Dynamo secured promotion to Russian First League.

Current squad
As of 22 February 2023, according to the Russian First League website.

Out on loan

Notable players
  Darko Spalević
  Mark Švets
  Shamil Burziyev
  Trayan Dyankov
  Ibragim Gasanbekov

See also 
Dynamo

References

External links
Official website 
Another Dynamo website 
Club history at KLISF

Football clubs in Russia
Sport in Makhachkala
Dynamo sports society
Association football clubs established in 1927
1927 establishments in Russia